Stenoglene decellei is a moth in the family Eupterotidae. It was described by Ugo Dall'Asta and G. Poncin in 1980. It is found in the former Democratic Republic of the Congo provinces of Équateur and Orientale and in South Africa.

Subspecies
Stenoglene decellei decellei (Democratic Republic of the Congo: Orientale)
Stenoglene decellei flava Dall'Asta & Poncin, 1980 (South Africa, Democratic Republic of the Congo: Equateur)

References

Moths described in 1980
Janinae